25 athletes (20 men and 5 women) from Hong Kong competed at the 1996 Summer Paralympics in Atlanta, United States.

Medallists

See also
Hong Kong at the Paralympics
Hong Kong at the 1996 Summer Olympics

References 

Nations at the 1996 Summer Paralympics
1996
Summer Paralympics